Brighton Seminole Indian Reservation is an Indian reservation of the Seminole Tribe of Florida, located in northeast Glades County near the northwest shore of Lake Okeechobee. It is one of six reservations held in trust by the federal government for this tribe. The reservation has a land area of approximately 146 square kilometers or 36,000 acres and a 2000 census resident population of 566 persons.

Some residents of the reservation speak the Muscogee language (or Creek), which is different from the Mikasuki language of other Seminoles and the Miccosukee tribe. Fewer than 200 people on the reservation speak Muscogee, which is the largest number of speakers in Florida and outside of Oklahoma. The Muscogee language is considered "definitely endangered" by UNESCO.

The Florida guide referred to a "Seminole Village" in 1939, south of the town of Brighton, on a 35,660-acre reservation: To serve the Seminole cattle business, "The Red Barn" was built in 1941 with help from the Civilian Conservation Corps. Hurricane Wilma damaged the roof, which was replaced in 2005.

The Seminole Tribe of Florida operates the Brighton Seminole Casino here, a 27,000-square-foot casino with 375-slot and gaming machines, a seven-table poker room, and high-stake bingo seats, with full-service restaurant and lounge. The reservation also is used for part of the tribe's cattle operations, the 12th-largest in the country.

Other reservations
The other five Seminole Tribe of Florida reservations are:

Big Cypress Reservation, the largest territory, including 81.972 sq mi (212.306 km), in Broward and Hendry Counties
Hollywood Reservation (formerly called the Dania Reservation),  acres, Broward County
Immokalee Reservation, Collier County
Fort Pierce Reservation, a  site in St. Lucie County, taken into trust for the tribe in 1995 by the United States Department of the Interior
Tampa Reservation, located in Hillsborough County

Notes

References
Mahon, John K.; Brent R. Weisman (1996). "Florida's Seminole and Miccosukee Peoples". In Gannon, Michael (Ed.). The New History of Florida, pp. 183–206. University Press of Florida. .
 Pritzker, Barry M. A Native American Encyclopedia: History, Culture, and Peoples. Oxford: Oxford University Press, 2000. .

External links
 Seminole Tribe of Florida, official website
Brighton Reservation, Florida, United States Census Bureau
 Brighton Seminole Indian Reservation Cemetery, Glades County, Florida, US GenWeb



American Indian reservations in Florida
Geography of Glades County, Florida
Unincorporated communities in Glades County, Florida
Unincorporated communities in Florida
Seminole Tribe of Florida